Bursaspor Kulübü Derneği, commonly known as Bursaspor, is a Turkish sports club located in the city of Bursa. Formed in 1963, the club colours are green and white, with home kits usually featuring both colours in a striped pattern.

In the 2009–10 season, the club's men's football team won its first Süper Lig title after finishing with 75 points, one point ahead of the runners-up Fenerbahçe. Bursaspor became the second club outside Istanbul to win a Süper Lig title, joining Trabzonspor who won the first of its six titles in 1975–76. The club has also won the Turkish Cup once and the Prime Minister's Cup twice, as well as the First League twice. The club's first, and most successful foray into European competition came in the 1974–75 European Cup Winners' Cup when it reached the quarter-finals. Bursaspor also took part in the 1986–87, losing in the first round, as well as the 1995 UEFA Intertoto Cup, where it lost in the quarter-finals.

History

Foundation and early years
The club was founded on 1 June 1963 after Acar İdman Yurdu, Akınspor, İstiklal, Pınarspor and Çelikspor were merged to form a single club; Bursaspor. Green and white were chosen as the club colours, and the club entered the 2. Lig in 1963–64. Their first match took place on 21 September 1963 against İzmir Demirspor in İzmir. Bursaspor were promoted to the Süper Lig after winning the 1966–67 2. Lig. They won 19 of their 30 matches, finishing with 45 points, eight ahead of second placed Samsunspor. They were relegated to the 2. Lig in 1985–86 and were relegated again in 1986–87 season, but their relegations were revoked due to winning the Turkish Cup in 1986 and a Turkish Council of State verdict in 1987. Their most recent relegation came in 2004. They gained promotion back into the Süper Lig after winning the First League on 16 May 2006. Bursaspor won their first major cup in 1971, beating Fenerbahçe 1–0 after extra time in the now-defunct Prime Minister's Cup. Because Fenerbahçe had won the league and cup in 1973–74, Bursaspor, as 1974 Turkish Cup runners up, were given a place in the 1974–75 European Cup Winners' Cup. Bursaspor reached the quarter-finals, beating Finn Harps and Dundee United, before falling to eventual champions Dynamo Kyiv. The club's first Turkish Cup win came in 1986 when they defeated Altay 2–0 in the finals. The club therefore qualified for the 1986–87 European Cup Winners' Cup, losing to eventual champions Ajax in the first round.

The league title
The 2009–10 season began successful and by the midpoint of the season, in December 2009; gameweek 17, the club were sitting in the top spot in the Süper Lig table. The first half of the season saw a 1–0 home victory against Istanbul giants Galatasaray, and also a 2–3 win away at Beşiktaş. In late 2009, Sağlam was linked with the vacant Turkey managerial position after Terim's resignation, but he refused to comment on the speculation. Guus Hiddink eventually took up the position. The latter part of the season saw a 6–0 win over mid–table İstanbul Büyükşehir Belediyespor, the largest win in the league to date this season, and also a 2–3 away win against Fenerbahçe after winning from two goals down. Bursaspor again reached the quarter-finals of the Turkish Cup and again they lost on aggregate to Fenerbahçe, this time crashing out 4–3 due to an injury time winner from Fener. In April 2010 Bursaspor sat at the top of the table after being in the top three for the past few months. With eight games left to play Bursaspor were five points clear at the top. Five weeks before the end of the season, Bursaspor fell to second place in the Süper Lig. They maintained pressure on Fenerbahçe who had overtaken them. Going into the final game of the season, Bursaspor were just one point behind Fener, and needed to better their results against defending champions Beşiktaş. Knowing that the match against Beşiktaş could prove decisive. With Fenerbahçe held to a 1–1 home draw against Trabzonspor, and Bursaspor beating Beşiktaş 2–1, the Bursaspor were crowned champions, by just a single point. They are only the second club outside the "Istanbul Big Three" who have won the league. Trabzonspor were the other team, who last won in 1983–84. Before winning its first Süper Lig title in 2009–10, Bursaspor had never finished inside the top three. The club won its first title in Ertuğrul Sağlam's first full season as manager of the club. Pablo Batalla and Ozan İpek were the club's joint top scorers with eight goals apiece. Bursaspor were drawn against Rangers, Valencia and Manchester United in the group stages of the 2010–11 UEFA Champions League. In its away match against Rangers, Bursaspor decided not to don their home kit to avoid provoking Rangers' fans, as their kit heavily resembles that of Rangers' rivals, Celtic. Bursaspor is the fourth football club in Turkey to start a dedicated television channel (Bursaspor TV).

Colours and badge
Bursaspor's club badge includes the club name, foundation year, and the crescent moon and star from the Turkish flag. As a tribute to the club's origins, the badge also includes five stars, each a different colour – black, red, yellow, green, and navy blue. This represents the colours used by the clubs that made up Bursaspor; Acar İdman Yurdu–black, Akınspor–red, İstiklal–yellow, Pınarspor–green, Çelikspor–navy blue. Bursaspor's kit: Green shirts with white trim, green shorts, green socks. Away: Green and white hooped shirts, white shorts, green and white hooped socks. Alternate: Amber shirts with black trim, claret shorts, amber socks.

Stadium

Bursaspor plays its home matches at Bursa Büyükşehir Stadium. Built in 2015, the stadium currently seats 43,761 spectators. The field measures 68 by 105 meters, and is covered with natural grass. Between 1979 and 2015, the club played at the Bursa Atatürk Stadium.

Supporters

Fans
The club's main fan base is known as Teksas (Texas) and Legend Teksas.

Special relationship with Ankaragücü
In the early 1990s Bursaspor's ultra group Teksas had a leader called Abdulkerim Bayraktar. He went to study in Ankara, and whilst in the city he started attending Ankaragücü games and started building ties between the two clubs. In 1993 however, his life was cut short during his military service when he was killed by terrorists. This tragic event bought Bursaspor and Ankaragücü even closer together. During the first game after his death, Bursaspor organised a tribute to him, and the events which happened next cemented the brotherhood between these two teams. A large group of Ankaragücü supporters made their way onto the pitch and unveiled a large banner reading 'Our brother Abdul will never die, he lives on in our hearts'. The two supporter groups united and hundreds of Ankaragücü ultras attended his funeral. From that day on, Bursaspor supporters would chant Ankaragücü's name in the 6th minute of every home game, 06 being significant due to 06 being Ankara's city code. Ankaragücü supporters in return chant Bursaspor's name during the 16th minute, 16 being Bursa's city code. When the two sides play, the supporters sit together; it is one of the rare occasions in which ultras from opposing teams watch a game together in a mixed environment. They bring BursAnkara scarfs (a merger of the two cities' names) to the games and create an atmosphere full of mutual respect.

European history

Matches

Notes
1 Karlsruhe progressed to the Semi-finals after winning a penalty shoot-out 6–5.
2 Chikhura progressed to the third qualifying round after winning a penalty shoot-out 4–1.

Players

Current squad

Other players under contract

Out on loan

List of former players

Honours

Domestic league
 Turkish Super League
 Winners (1): 2009–10
 1. Lig
 Winners (2): 1966–67, 2005–06

Domestic cup
 Turkish Cup
 Winners (1): 1985–86
Runners-up (5): 1971, 1974, 1992, 2012, 2015
 Turkish Super Cup
Runners-up (3): 1986, 2010, 2015

Technical staff

Managers

Notes

References

External links

 Official Website 
  
 Fan Website 
 Bursa 224 Fan Website  
 Bursaspor Texas Fan Website 
 Bursaspor News Website 

 
Association football clubs established in 1963
Sport in Bursa
Football clubs in Turkey
1963 establishments in Turkey
Süper Lig clubs